Public Pigeon No. 1 is a 1957 comedy film directed by Norman Z. McLeod. It stars Red Skelton and Vivian Blaine. It is the theatrical feature-length remake of the Climax! television episode "Public Pigeon #1" that also starred Red Skelton, but was directed by Seymour Berns, which aired in the second season of that show on September 8, 1955.

Plot
Rusty Morgan is irresponsible, but girlfriend Edith Enders trusts him. They put their money in a joint bank account.

A con man, Harvey Baker, is able to persuade Rusty to buy his worthless uranium certificates, claiming they are worth $10,000. His cronies Rita and Frankie take the swindle further, resulting in Rusty losing his job at a cafe and Lt. Qualen of the bunco squad letting him know that these are wanted crooks with a $10,000 reward on their heads.

Rusty accidentally finds out where Rita is and follows her. He is so gullible, he believes it when told they are agents working secretly for the FBI. He ends up a pigeon for their scheme, arrested and sentenced to five years in prison.

No one could be this stupid, the crooks conclude, and mistakenly believe Rusty has their stolen money in a safety deposit box. Edith concocts a scheme with Qualen to break Rusty out of jail so the crooks will follow him. Qualen ends up arresting the lot, and Rusty and Edith get to share the $10,000 reward.

Cast
Red Skelton as Rusty Morgan 
Janet Blair as Edith Enders
Vivian Blaine as Rita DeLacey
Jay C. Flippen as Lt. Ross Quelan
Allyn Joslyn as Harvey Baker
Lyle Latell as Police Sergeant Ryan

References

External links

1957 films
1950s crime comedy films
American crime comedy films
American prison films
Films about con artists
Films based on television plays
Films directed by Norman Z. McLeod
Films scored by David Rose
RKO Pictures films
Universal Pictures films
1957 comedy films
1950s English-language films
1950s American films